The Shortgrass Library System consists of fourteen member public libraries in Southeast Alberta, Canada.  The system headquarters is located in Medicine Hat.  It has the distinction of being the first regional library system in the province of Alberta to have all eligible municipalities as members of a library system. Shortgrass was created by the Alberta government in 1988 as the fifth library system in the province. 
Services provided by Shortgrass for member libraries include cataloguing, deliveries, maintenance of the automated library system, IT support, and licensing of digital content.

Services
Information and reference services
Access to full text databases
Community information
Internet access
Reader's advisory services
Programs for children, youth and adults
Delivery to homebound individuals
Interlibrary loan
Free downloadable audiobooks

History 
In 1988, the municipalities of Brooks, Medicine Hat, Redcliff, Foremost, Bow Island, and the County of 40 Mile formed the Shortgrass Library System (SLS). Also during 1988, municipalities were invited to bid on the location for the headquarters building. The communities of Brooks, Redcliff and Medicine Hat all bid on becoming the home of the future SLS Headquarters. After much deliberation, Medicine Hat was chosen. The Medicine Hat Public Library was designated as the resource center for SLS with responsibility for coordinating interlibrary services and providing reference services. 

The Graham Community Library in Ralston entered into a contract with SLS in 2000. Then in 2003, the Town of Bassano and County of Newell (Divisions 1, 4, 5, 6 and 10, Rolling Hills and Rainier) joined SLS as municipal members. This meant that Alcoma Community Library, Bassano Memorial Library, and Rolling Hills Public Library became members in the Shortgrass Library system. Rosemary and the County of Newell Division 7 joined SLS in 2004. The municipalities of Cypress County and Tilley joined Shortgrass in 2005. Graham Community Library became a full member of SLS in 2005.  On May 13, 2011, the Duchess and District Public Library agreed to become a partner with the Shortgrass Library System.  With the Duchess and District Public Library becoming a member, the Shortgrass Library System is the first regional library system in the province of Alberta to have all eligible municipalities as members of the library system.

Branches
As of June 2015, the following libraries are members of the Shortgrass Library System:
 Bassano Memorial Library 
 Bow Island Municipal Library
 Brooks Public Library
 Duchess and District Public Library
 Foremost Municipal Library
 Gem Jubilee Library
 Medicine Hat Public Library
 Alcoma Public Library (located in Rainier)
 Graham Community Library (located in Ralston)
 Irvine Community Library (located in Irvine)
 Redcliff Public Library
 Rolling Hills Public Library
 Rosemary Community Library
 Tilley and District Public Library

SLS has provided contract services for the Medicine Hat School District #76 since 1997 and the Prairie Rose School Division #8 since 2004.

References

External links
Shortgrass Library System
Alberta Municipal Affairs: Library Systems

Public libraries in Alberta
Medicine Hat
Libraries established in 1988
1988 establishments in Canada